Huang Peilan (1908 – 1 November 1962) was a Chinese politician. She was among the first group of women elected to the Legislative Yuan in 1948.

Biography
Huang was born 1908 and was originally from Dongguan in Guangdong province. She attended  and subsequently worked for the government, serving as secretary of the Kuomintang's women's committee and head girls' primary and middle schools in Nanjing. She became a member of the Women's Advisory Committee, becoming head of its Life Guidance division.

Huang was a delegate to the 1946  that drew up the constitution of the Republic of China. She was a member of the Guangdong provincial Senate and contested the 1948 elections for the Legislative Yuan as a Kuomintang candidate in Guangdong, winning a seat in parliament. She relocated to Taiwan during the Chinese Civil War, where she remained a member of the Legislative Yuan until her death in 1962.

References

1908 births
Chinese civil servants
20th-century Chinese women politicians
Members of the Kuomintang
Members of the 1st Legislative Yuan
Members of the 1st Legislative Yuan in Taiwan
1962 deaths